Mordecai Gist (1743–1792) was a member of a prominent Maryland family who became a brigadier general in command of the Maryland Line in the Continental Army during the American Revolutionary War.

Life
Gist was born in Baltimore, Maryland (one source says Reisterstown, Maryland), the fourth child of Thomas and Susannah Cockey Gist. Thomas Gist's father, Captain Richard Gist (1684 – August 28, 1741), was the surveyor of Maryland's Eastern Shore and one of the commissioners who laid out Baltimore Town in 1729. Richard Gist's father, Christopher Richard Gist (1655 or 1659 – Feb. 1690), was an English emigrant who came to the Province of Maryland before 1682 and settled in "South Canton" on the south bank of the Patapsco River. Christopher Richard Gist married Edith Cromwell (1660–1694), who is believed to have been a relative of Oliver Cromwell.

Gist was the nephew of Christopher Gist (1706–1759), a son of Richard Gist. Christopher Gist was a Colonial-era explorer, scout, and frontier settler who was employed by the Ohio Company and had served with 21-year-old Colonel George Washington. (Christopher Gist is credited with twice saving Washington's life when they were surveying land in the Ohio country in 1753.)  Mordecai Gist was also distantly related to John Eager Howard.

Mordecai Gist was educated for commercial pursuits. At the beginning of the American Revolution, the young men of Baltimore associated under the title of the "Baltimore Independent Company" and elected Gist as their captain. It was the first company raised in Maryland for the defense of popular liberty.

Revolutionary War service
In 1776, Gist was appointed major of Smallwood's Maryland Regiment, and was with them in the Battle of Long Island, where they fought a delaying action at the Old Stone House (Brooklyn, New York), allowing the American army to escape encirclement.

In January 1779, the Continental Congress appointed him as a brigadier general in the Continental Army, and he took the command of the 2nd Maryland Brigade. He fought stubbornly at the Battle of Camden in South Carolina in 1780. At one time after a bayonet charge, his force secured fifty prisoners, but the British under Lord Cornwallis rallied, and the Marylanders gave way. Gist escaped, and, a year later, he was present at the surrender of Cornwallis at Yorktown. (Gist appears (back row, right side) in John Trumbull's painting Surrender of Lord Cornwallis which hangs in the rotunda of the United States Capitol in Washington, D.C.)

He joined the southern army under Nathanael Greene, and he was given the command of the light corps again when the army was remodeled in 1782. On August 26, 1782, he rallied the broken forces of the Americans under John Laurens after they had been scattered in an ambush set by a British foraging party.

After the war
After the war, Gist relocated to a plantation near Charleston, South Carolina. He was admitted as an original member of The Society of the Cincinnati of Maryland and was elected as the first vice president of the Maryland Society on November 22, 1783. He later transferred his membership to the South Carolina Society.  Gist also served as the grand master of Freemasons in South Carolina.

He had two children, both sons, one of whom he named "Independent" and the other "States." He died on September 12, 1792, at the age of 50, in Charleston and is buried in St. Michael's Churchyard next to his son, States Gist, and daughter Susannah Gist.

Mordecai Gist was distantly related to States Rights Gist, a brigadier general in the Confederate army during the American Civil War who died of wounds received while leading his brigade in a charge against U.S. fortifications at the Battle of Franklin in November 1864. States Rights Gist was the great-grandson of William Gist (born 1711), uncle of Mordecai Gist.

His papers are held at the Maryland Historical Society.

Notes

References

External links

 
 The Society of the Cincinnati
 The American Revolution Institute

1743 births
1792 deaths
American slave owners
Burials at St. Michael's Churchyard (Charleston)
Continental Army generals
Continental Army officers from Maryland
People from Baltimore
People of colonial Maryland